Santanu Sen  is an Indian doctor and politician. He was a councilor in the Kolkata Municipal Corporation. He is a Rajya Sabha member  from West Bengal. He was the President of the Indian Medical Association.

Life

Shantanu Sen was born into a Bengali family.

Controversy
On 22 July 2021, he snatched the papers on Pegasus scandal from the hands of the IT minister Ashwini Vaishnaw in the Rajya Sabha, tore it and threw it towards the Deputy Chairman. Because of his parliamentary behavior, he was suspended from the Rajya Sabha for the remaining period of monsoon session.

References

Trinamool Congress politicians from West Bengal
Rajya Sabha members from West Bengal
Living people
1972 births